The Texas A&M Engineering Experiment Station (TEES, pronounced "tease") is an engineering research agency within The Texas A&M University System and is governed by the Board of Regents.

Headquartered in College Station, TEES has a close relationship with Texas A&M University, as well as regional divisions at 17 other institutions of higher education in Texas and affiliations with community colleges.

Leadership
 Dr. John E. Hurtado, Interim Director
 Dr. Dimitris Lagoudas, deputy director
 Dr. Arul Jayaraman, associate agency director
 Joe Dunn, Interim Chief Financial Officer
 Lisa Akin, Chief Operating Officer
 Dr. Cindy Lawley, assistant agency director for workforce development
 Dr. Balakrishna Haridas, director for technology commercialization and entrepreneurship
 Cindy Wall, assistant agency director for regional divisions
 Eyad Masad, director for global initiatives
 Dr. Steve Cambone, associate vice chancellor for cybersecurity initiatives
 Kiley Wren, executive director, Office of Industry Relations
 Dr. L. Diane Hurtado, associate vice chancellor for national laboratories management

University partners

 Angelo State University
 Lamar University
 New Mexico State University
 Prairie View A&M University
 Tarleton State University
 Texas A&M International University
 Texas A&M University
 Texas A&M University at Galveston
 Texas A&M University-Central Texas
 Texas A&M University-Commerce
 Texas A&M University-Corpus Christi
 Texas A&M University-Kingsville
 Texas A&M University-San Antonio
 Texas A&M University-Texarkana
 Texas State University
 Texas Woman's University
 University of North Texas
 West Texas A&M University

Two-year college partners

 Amarillo College
 Blinn College
 Brazosport College
 Del Mar College
 Hill College
 Houston Community College
 Lone Star College
 Texas State Technical College
 Victoria College
 Weatherford College
 Wharton Jr. College

References

External links
 TEES Homepage

Engineering Experiment Station, Texas
Texas A&M University System